Lalita Babar (born 2 June 1989) is an Indian long-distance runner. She was born in a small village in the Satara district, Maharashtra. She predominantly competes in the 3000 metres steeplechase and is the current Indian national record holder and the reigning Asian Champion in the same event.

Babar was named as the Sports Person of the Year in the India Sports Awards 2015 organised by Federation of Indian Chambers of Commerce and Industry (FICCI) and the Ministry of Youth Affairs and Sports of India.

Early life and junior career 
Babar was born on 2 June 1989 in Mohi, a village in Satara district, in the Indian State of Maharashtra into a family of farmers. She was born in an area which was regularly affected by droughts, which adversely affects the agriculture in the area.

Babar started her career in athletics as a long-distance runner at a young age. She won her first Gold medal in the U-20 National Championships at Pune in 2005.

Career

Babar began her career in track and field athletics as a long-distance runner.

In 2014, she became the hat-trick winner of the Mumbai Marathon. Determined to win a medal in multi-discipline events like the Asian Games and Commonwealth Games, she switched to 3000 metres steeplechase in January 2014, following her win at the marathon. At the 2014 Asian Games in Incheon, South Korea, she won the bronze medal clocking 9:35.37 in the final. In the process, she broke the national record held by Sudha Singh.

At the 2015 Asian Championships, Babar won the gold medal clocking 9:34.13 and broke her own personal record, the Indian national record and the games record. In the process, she qualified for the 2016 Summer Olympics. She also qualified for 2016 Summer Olympic in Marathon with her personal best of 2:38:21 at Mumbai Marathon 2015. She went on to break the record again at the 2015 World Championships in Beijing with a time of 9:27.86 in her qualifying heat. Being the first Indian woman to qualify for the steeplechase final, she placed eighth in the final.

In April 2016, she again bettered the national record with a time of 9:27.09 at the Federation Cup National Athletics Championships in New Delhi. At the Rio de Janeiro Summer Olympics, she bettered it with a time of 9:19.76 in her heat, qualifying to the final, and in the process became the first Indian in 32 years to enter a final in any track event. At the final, she finished 10th with a time of 9:22.74.

Public servant
According to a news story dated 2020-11-28, Babar has been appointed as tahasildar of Mangaon a taluka in Raigad district of Maharashtra, from the sports quota.

Competition record

Awards
Sports Person of the Year Awards (2015), FICCI and Ministry of Youth Affairs and Sports

India Sports Awards (2015), by FICCI and Ministry of Youth Affairs and Sports

Arjuna Award, by Government of India

References

External links
 

1989 births
Living people
Sportswomen from Maharashtra
Indian female steeplechase runners
Indian female marathon runners
Indian female long-distance runners
21st-century Indian women
21st-century Indian people
Asian Games medalists in athletics (track and field)
Athletes (track and field) at the 2014 Asian Games
Commonwealth Games competitors for India
Athletes (track and field) at the 2010 Commonwealth Games
World Athletics Championships athletes for India
Asian Games bronze medalists for India
Athletes (track and field) at the 2016 Summer Olympics
Olympic athletes of India
People from Satara district
Medalists at the 2014 Asian Games
Athletes from Maharashtra
Recipients of the Arjuna Award